The Indian Institute of Tropical Meteorology (IITM) is a scientific institution based in Pune, Maharashtra, India for expanding research in the tropical Indian Ocean with special reference to monsoon meteorology, and air-sea interaction of South Asian climate. It is an Autonomous Institute of the Ministry of Earth Sciences, Government of India.

History 
As proposed in the third five-year plan of India, the Indian Institute of Tropical Meteorology (IITM) was founded as the Institute of Tropical Meteorology on 17 November 1962 at Pune as an individual unit of the India Meteorological Department (IMD), the main organization responsible for meteorological observations, weather forecasts, and detecting earthquakes in India. 

On the recommendation of the Committee for Organization of Scientific Research of the Government of India, the Institute of Tropical Meteorology was then made an autonomous institution under the new name, Indian Institute of Tropical Meteorology, on 1 April 1971.

Until 1984, it worked under the Ministry of Tourism and Civil Aviation. In 1985, it was taken by the Department of Science and Technology/Ministry of Science and Technology. As per the notification No. O.M. No.25/10/2006 dated 19 July 2006 by the President of India, the institute has been put under the control of the Ministry of Earth Sciences (MoES) with effect from 12 July 2006.

Academics 
The institute offers a M.Sc., M.Tech. and Ph.D. courses jointly under the aegis of the Department of Atmospheric and Space Sciences, University of Pune. Apart from degree-courses, students can also apply for summer or master's thesis projects to individual scientists based on their research.

Computational facility
Adithya HPC, one of the largest computational capacities of India, is located at IITM. It is a common facility for all MoES institutions.

Pratyush or Prathyush (Hindi: प्रत्यूष, meaning "first light on the sky before rising the Sun") is a supercomputer designed and developed by IITM, Pune. As of January 2018, Pratyush is the fastest supercomputer in India, with a maximum speed of 6.8 petaflops.

The system was inaugurated by Dr. Harsh Vardhan, Union Minister for science and technology, on 8 January 2018.

Pratyush consists of two High-Performance Computing (HPC) units. They are located at two government institutes: 4.0 petaflops unit at IITM, Pune; and 2.8 petaflops unit at the National Centre for Medium Range Weather Forecasting (NCMRWF), Noida. Pratyush uses both units and provides a combined output of 6.8 PetaFlops.

Pratyush is used in the fields of weather forecasting and climate monitoring in India. It helps the country to make better forecasts in terms of monsoon; fishing; air quality; extreme events like a tsunami, cyclones, earthquakes, and lightning; and other natural calamities such as floods and droughts.

India is the fourth country in the world to have a High-Performance Computing facility dedicated to weather and climate research, after Japan, the United States and the United Kingdom.

References

External links
 Website of the Indian Institute of Tropical Meteorology

India Meteorological Department
Research institutes in Pune
Research institutes established in 1962
1962 establishments in Maharashtra